A unitary enterprise is a government-owned corporation in Russia and some other post-Soviet states. Unitary enterprises are business entities that have no ownership rights to the assets that they use in their operations. This form is possible only for state and municipal enterprises, which respectively operate state or municipal property. The owners of the property of a unitary enterprise have no responsibility for its operation and vice versa.

Russia

Federal Law No. 161-ФЗ "On State and Municipal Unitary Enterprises" (amended July 13, 2015), defines the legal status of unitary enterprises in Russia. The State Duma passed this law on October 11, 2002, and President Putin signed it on November 14, 2002.

The assets of unitary enterprises belong to the federal government, to a Russian federal subject, or to a municipality. A unitary enterprise holds assets under economic management (for both state and municipal unitary enterprises) or under operative management (for state unitary enterprises only), but has limited property rights over the assets. The term "unitary" specifies the assets as indivisible, i.e., they may not be distributed among the participants in any way. Property granted to a unitary enterprise can be sold or otherwise alienated only with the consent of the state or municipal property owner.

The existence of unitary enterprises is a legacy of the Soviet era, when the state owned the means of production. The managers of state enterprises often have close ties to the state agencies which established them, a situation that can lead to legal and political problems.

A unitary enterprise is independent in economic issues and obliged only to give its profits to the state. Unitary enterprises have no right to set up subsidiaries, but they can, with the owner's consent, open branches and representation offices.

Though government entities own the unitary enterprises, the enterprises themselves work on the basis of commercial accounts and of commercial legislation. They come under ministerial responsibility but are off-budget. They may be auxiliary to a ministry's activity, such as a printing house under the Ministry of Education or a production facility for police equipment under the Ministry of Internal Affairs. Unitary enterprises have a distinct legal status, different from regular market-sector corporations.

Some of the largest federal state unitary enterprises include Russian Post,  and All-Russia State Television and Radio Broadcasting Company, while large non-federal unitary enterprises include Moscow Metro, Mosgortrans and Saint Petersburg Metro.

See also
Civil Code of Russia

References

Types of business entity
Economy of Russia
 
Russia